Trot is a two-beat diagonal gait of the horse.

Trot or trots may also refer to:
Trot (music), a genre of Korean pop music
Trot (Oz), a character from the Oz books of L. Frank Baum
Trot (lai), a medieval Old French poem
Trot, informal term for a Trotskyist
The trots, a slang term for diarrhea
Trot, a term for a literal translation
Trot Nixon, Christopher Trotman "Trot" Nixon (born 1974), former American baseball player

See also
Trott, a surname
Trotto (dance music), 14th-century social dance / dance music in the Western world
Trotline, a heavy fishing line
Turkey trot (disambiguation)